The Starkey House, also known as the Alworth House, is a residential house in Duluth, Minnesota, United States overlooking Lake Superior. The house was designed by modernist architect Marcel Breuer in 1954 and 1955 for June Halverson Starkey (née Alworth). The building's design references Breuer's hallmark bi-nuclear plan, in which sleeping and living spaces are linked through the home's entrance.

References 

Buildings and structures in Duluth, Minnesota
Marcel Breuer buildings